Achelois (Ancient Greek: , Ἀkhelōís means 'she who drives away pain') was a name attributed to several figures in Greek mythology.

Achelois, surname of the Sirens, the daughters of Achelous.

Achelois, a general name for water-nymphs, as in Columella, where the companions of the Pegasids are called Acheloides.
Achelois, a daughter of Pierus and one of the Pierides.

Notes

References 

 Apollodorus, The Library with an English Translation by Sir James George Frazer, F.B.A., F.R.S. in 2 Volumes, Cambridge, MA, Harvard University Press; London, William Heinemann Ltd. 1921. ISBN 0-674-99135-4. Online version at the Perseus Digital Library. Greek text available from the same website.
 Bell, Robert E., Women of Classical Mythology: A Biographical Dictionary. ABC-Clio. 1991. .
Graves, Robert, The Greek Myths, Harmondsworth, London, England, Penguin Books, 1960. 
Graves, Robert, The Greek Myths: The Complete and Definitive Edition. Penguin Books Limited. 2017. 
Publius Ovidius Naso, Metamorphoses translated by Brookes More (1859-1942). Boston, Cornhill Publishing Co. 1922. Online version at the Perseus Digital Library.
 Publius Ovidius Naso, Metamorphoses. Hugo Magnus. Gotha (Germany). Friedr. Andr. Perthes. 1892. Latin text available at the Perseus Digital Library.

Children of Achelous
Female legendary creatures
Greek legendary creatures
Human-headed mythical creatures
Legendary birds
Musicians in Greek mythology
Mythological human hybrids
Naiads
Princesses in Greek mythology